Anakena  is a white coral sand beach in Rapa Nui National Park on Rapa Nui (Easter Island), a Chilean island in the Pacific Ocean. Anakena has two ahus; Ahu-Ature has a single moai and Ahu Nao-Nao has seven, two of which have deteriorated. It also has a palm grove and a car park.

Anakena is unusual for Easter Island in that it is one of only two small sandy beaches in an otherwise rocky coastline.

Legend and History 
According to island oral traditions, Anakena was the landing place of Hotu Matu'a, a Polynesian chief who led a two-canoe settlement party here and founded the first settlement on Rapa Nui.

It was later a ceremonial centre where islanders read from Rongorongo boards.

Anakena featured in the Tangata manu or Birdman cult as in years when the new Birdman was from the western clans, he would end his celebrations at Anakena.

Archaeology 
Modern archaeology has found traces of human settlement at Anakena as early as 1200 CE, though linguistic and other analysis indicates a range of dates for first settlement of Rapa Nui between 300 and 1200 CE.

Anakena has been the site of several archaeological digs including those of Katherine Routledge in 1914 and both William Mulloy and Thor Heyerdahl in the 1950s, and both of its ahus have been restored.

Popular culture 
Anakena was used as one of the film locations for the 1994 Kevin Reynolds film Rapa Nui.

External links 
 PBS Nova: Anakena

References 

Geography of Easter Island
Archaeological sites in Chile
Archaeological sites in Easter Island
Outdoor sculptures
Megalithic monuments
Beaches of Chile
Tourist attractions in Valparaíso Region
Landforms of Valparaíso Region
Landforms of Easter Island
Beaches of Oceania
Outdoor structures in Chile